Kenmore House may refer to:

Australia 
 Kenmore House, Rockhampton, a heritage-listed house in Queensland

United States 
 Kenmore (Fredericksburg, Virginia), a heritage-listed plantation house
 Kenmore (Spotsylvania County, Virginia), a heritage-listed house